Shingo Kunieda defeated Alfie Hewett in the final, 4–6, 7–5, 7–6(10–5) to win the gentlemen's singles wheelchair tennis title at the 2022 Wimbledon Championships. It was his first Wimbledon singles title and record-extending 28th major singles title overall. With the win, Kunieda completed both a non-calendar year Grand Slam and the career Super Slam. Hewett served for the championship four times, but was broken all four times by Kunieda.

Joachim Gérard was the defending champion, but was defeated by Kunieda in the semifinals.

Seeds

Draw

Finals

References

Sources
 Entry List
 Draw
 ITF Tournament Details

Men's Wheelchair Singles
Wimbledon Championship by year – Wheelchair men's singles